The New York Film Critics Circle Award for Best Actor is one of the awards given by the New York Film Critics Circle to honor the finest achievements in film-making.

Winners

1930s

1940s

1950s

1960s

1970s

1980s

1990s

2000s

2010s

2020s

Multiple awards
4 wins
Daniel Day-Lewis (1989, 2002, 2007, 2012)
Jack Nicholson (1974, 1975, 1985, 1987)

3 wins
 Robert De Niro (1976, 1980, 1990)
 Burt Lancaster (1953, 1960, 1981)
 Laurence Olivier (1946, 1948, 1972)

2 wins
 Marlon Brando (1954, 1973)
 James Cagney (1938, 1942)
 James Stewart (1939, 1959)
 Jon Voight (1969, 1978)

See also
 National Board of Review Award for Best Actor
 National Society of Film Critics Award for Best Actor
 Los Angeles Film Critics Association Award for Best Actor

References

External links
 nyfcc.com

Film awards for lead actor
New York Film Critics Circle Awards